James Victor Nelson (born September 5, 1959) is an American former professional baseball player. Nelson played in Major League Baseball (MLB) for the Seattle Mariners during the 1983 season. In 40 games, Nelson had 21 hits in 96 at-bats with five RBIs. He was a catcher and batted and threw right-handed.

He was drafted by the New York Mets in the 8th round of the 1978 Major League Baseball draft.

Nelson served as a coach with the Tampa Bay Rays from 2013 to 2016.

External links

Retrosheet

1959 births
Living people
Albany-Colonie Yankees players
American expatriate baseball players in Canada
Bakersfield Outlaws players
Baseball coaches from Oklahoma
Baseball players from Oklahoma
Columbus Clippers players
Edmonton Trappers players
Leones del Caracas players
American expatriate baseball players in Venezuela
Lynchburg Mets players
Lynn Sailors players
Major League Baseball catchers
Memphis Chicks players
Midland Angels players
Mobile Baysharks players
Omaha Royals players
Orange Coast Pirates baseball players
People from Clinton, Oklahoma
Portland Beavers players
Salt Lake City Gulls players
Seattle Mariners players
Tampa Bay Rays coaches
Vancouver Canadians players
Wausau Mets players